Arumbanur is a census town in Madurai-North, Madurai district in the state of Tamil Nadu, India. It is 4.5  by road northeast of the village of Kadachanendal.

Demographics
At the 2001 India census, Arumbanur had a population of 1,506. Males, 767, constituted 51% of the population and females, 739, constituted 49%.

In the 2011 census the population of Arumbanur was 6,173.

Politics
It is part of the Madurai (Lok Sabha constituency). S. Venkatesan also known as  Su. Venkatesan from CPI(M) is the Member of Parliament, Lok Sabha, after his election in the 2019 Indian general election.

Notes

Cities and towns in Madurai district